The Great Glen Fault is a strike-slip fault that runs through the Great Glen in Scotland. The fault is mostly inactive today, but occasional moderate tremors have been recorded over the past 150 years.

Location
Aligned northeast to southwest, the Great Glen Fault extends further southwest in a straight line through Loch Linnhe and the Firth of Lorne, and then on into northwestern Ireland, directly through Lough Swilly, Donegal Bay and Clew Bay as the Leannan Fault. To the northeast the fault connects to the Walls Boundary Fault and the associated Melby Fault and Nestings Fault, before becoming obscured by the effects of Mesozoic rifting to the north of Shetland.

The fault continues on the North American side of the North Atlantic Ocean, but is no longer part of a contiguous fault, as the complete fault was broken when the Mid-Atlantic Ridge formed 200 million years ago. The North American side of the fault runs through the length of northwestern Newfoundland, Canada, as the Cabot Fault (Long Range Fault) and on into the Gulf of St. Lawrence.

History

The Great Glen Fault has a long movement history. It formed towards the end of the Caledonian orogeny associated with the collision between the Laurentia and Baltic tectonic plates at the end of the Silurian continuing into the Early Devonian (likely age range 430–390 Ma (million years)). The movement at that time was sinistral (left-lateral), the same as the closely related set of faults sub-parallel to the main part of the Great Glen Fault, which include the Strathconon Fault and Strathglass Faults to the northwest and the Laggan Fault, Tyndrum Fault, and Ericht-Laidon Fault to the southeast. The second main phase of movement was during the Carboniferous, this time with a dextral sense.

The exact timing is uncertain, but associated folds within the Devonian are cut by members of the Late Carboniferous to Early Permian dyke swarm. The Great Glen Fault had its final phase of movement during the Late Cretaceous to Early Tertiary. The displacement is estimated to be 64 miles (104 km).

Erosion along the fault zone during Quaternary glaciation formed Loch Ness.

The fault is mostly inactive today, but occasional moderate tremors have been recorded over the past 150 years which has meant that seismic buffers are built into the Kessock Bridge carrying the A9 road out of Inverness. None of the modern day infrastructure has been affected by the tremors; the most recent significant event to affect Inverness and the surrounding area occurred in September 1901 and was approximately a 5.0 magnitude quake. In the 19th century, a boat canal known as the Caledonian Canal was dug through the Great Glen; the canal is still used today.

See also
Aspy Fault
 Avalonia
Long Range Mountains

References

Further reading

External link 
 

Plate tectonics
Structural geology
Geology of Scotland
Geology of Newfoundland and Labrador
Geography of County Donegal
Lochaber
Geography of Argyll and Bute
Geography of Inverness
Seismic faults of the United Kingdom
Strike-slip faults
Loch Ness